{{Infobox person
| name        =  Daniela Ritorto
| image       =
| caption     = Display Picture of Ritorto working at BBC
| occupation  = Journalist, presenter
| credits     = ABC News 24  BBC World News & Special Broadcasting Service.
}} 
Daniela Ritorto is an Australian journalist, presenter and communications consultant. Ritorto was previously the Chief Political Correspondent and Parliament House Bureau Chief for the Special Broadcasting Service. Originally Ritorto worked for the Australian Broadcasting Corporation in Australia, and in London for BBC World News. While working at BBC World News, she hosted a variety of programmes. She returned to Adelaide in 2018 and was the media and communications manager for energy company Santos Limited before leaving in 2019.

When Ritorto started work for the Australian Broadcasting Corporation, she was the news presenter for 1062 ABC Local Radio Riverland in 2003 until 2004, when she moved to South Australian politics for ABC News 24. Ritorto stayed for a number of years before moving to London to work for the BBC.

At BBC World News, Ritorto has been the presenter for a number of programmes including the main weekend overnight presenter of BBC World News which is broadcast on BBC News in the UK, around the world on BBC World News and on public television in America, live from the 'World's Newsroom in London'. Other roles she has held for the BBC are; the London presenter of Newsday, World News Today, & Outside Source'' primarily on a relief/need-by-need basis. However, in January 2016 Ritorto posted onto Twitter that she had returned to Australia and had left the BBC after 5 years of service. 

Ritorto is married to ALP politician and Minister for Health and Aged Care Mark Butler.

References

Australian journalists
BBC World News
BBC newsreaders and journalists
Living people
Year of birth missing (living people)